Sara Rosted Holmgaard (born 28 January 1999) is a Danish professional football player who plays as a midfielder for Everton in the FA Women's Super League and for the Danish national team.

Career
She made her international debut for the Danish national team in the 2019 Algarve Cup, against Norway on 27 February 2019.

She is the twin sister of Everton teammate Karen Holmgaard.

She switched in December 2020, to the German top club 1. FFC Turbine Potsdam, together with Karen Holmgaard. She then went back to Fortuna Hjørring. In June 2022, she was selected for A-national coach Lars Søndergaard's final squad at the European Championship 2022 in England.

Achievements 
Elitedivisionen 
Winner (1): 2017–18
Silver Medalist (1): 2018–19
Danish Women's Cup 
Winner (1): 2019

References

External links
 
 

1999 births
Living people
Danish women's footballers
Denmark women's international footballers
Expatriate sportspeople in England
Expatriate sportspeople in Germany
Fortuna Hjørring players
Everton F.C. (women) players
Danish twins
Twin sportspeople
Women's association football midfielders
1. FFC Turbine Potsdam players
UEFA Women's Euro 2022 players